Danone S.A. is a French multinational food-products corporation based in Paris. It was founded in 1919 in Barcelona, Spain. It is listed on Euronext Paris where it is a component of the CAC 40 stock market index. Some of the company's products are branded Dannon in the United States.

As of 2018, Danone sold products in 120 markets, and had sales in 2018 of €24.65 billion. In the first half of 2018, 29% of sales came from specialized nutritional preparations, 19% came from branded bottled water, and 52% came from dairy and plant-based products (including yogurt).

History

Name

Danone was founded by Isaac Carasso (born İzak Karasu), a Salonica-born Sephardic Jewish physician from the Ottoman Empire, who began producing yogurt in Barcelona, Spain in 1919. The brand was named Danone, which translates to "little Daniel", after his son Daniel Carasso.

In 1929, Isaac Carasso moved the company from Spain to France, opening a plant in Paris. In 1942, Daniel Carasso moved the company to New York. In the United States, Daniel Carasso partnered with the Swiss-born Spaniard Juan Metzger and changed the brand name to Dannon to sound more American.

In 1951, Daniel Carasso returned to Paris to manage the family's businesses in France and Spain, and the American business was sold to Beatrice Foods in 1959; it was repurchased by Danone in 1981. In Europe in 1967, Danone merged with Gervais, the leading fresh cheese producer in France, and became Gervais Danone. In 1973, the company merged with bottle maker BSN. The company changed its name to Groupe Danone in 1983.

Strategic reorientation
The acquisitions initially took the shape of vertical integration, with BSN acquiring Alsatian brewer Kronenbourg and Evian branded mineral water who were the glassmaker's largest customers. This move provided content with which to fill the factory's bottles. In 1973, the company merged with Gervais Danone and began to expand internationally, including a rebranding of the Dannon yogurt brand in the U.S. and a successful ad campaign In Soviet Georgia. In 1979, the company abandoned glassmaking by disposing of Verreries Boussois. In 1987, Gervais Danone acquired European biscuit manufacturer Général Biscuit, owners of the LU brand, and, in 1989, it bought out the European biscuit operations of Nabisco, The operation included UK manufacturers Huntley and Palmers, Peek Frean, and Jacob's, which had previously merged to form Associated Biscuits Ltd.

In 1994, BSN changed its name to Groupe Danone, adopting the name of the group's best-known international brand. Franck Riboud succeeded his father, Antoine, as the company's chairman and chief executive officer in 1996 when Riboud senior retired. Under Riboud junior, the company continued to pursue its focus on three product groups (dairy, beverages, and cereals) and divested itself of several activities which had become non-core including Amora, Liebig, and Maille brands.

In 1999 and 2003, the group sold 56% and 44% respectively of its glass-containers business. In 2000, the group also sold most of its European beer activities (the brand Kronenbourg and the brand 1664 were sold to Scottish & Newcastle for £1.7 billion; its Italian cheese and meat businesses (Egidio Galbani Spa) were sold in March 2002; as were its beer producing activities in China. The company's British (Jacob's) and Irish biscuit operations were sold to United Biscuits in September 2004. In August 2005, the Group sold its sauces business in the United Kingdom and in the United States (HP Foods), in January 2006, its sauces business in Asia (Amoy Food) was sold to Ajinomoto. Despite these divestitures, Danone continues to expand internationally in its three core business units, emphasising health and well-being products.

In July 2007, it was announced that Danone had reached agreement with Kraft Foods Inc (now Mondelēz International) to sell most of its biscuits division, including the LU and Prince brands but excluding Latin American (Bagley) and Indian (Britannia Industries) units, for around €5.3 billion. Also in July 2007, a €12.3 billion cash offer by Danone for the Dutch baby food and clinical nutrition company Numico was agreed to by both boards, creating the world's second-largest manufacturer of baby food.

In 2009, the company changed its name from Groupe Danone to Danone.

Danone acquired the Unimilk group's companies in Russia in 2010 and the Wockhardt group's nutrition activities in India in 2012. In mid-February 2013 Danone announced their intention to cut 900 jobs or about 3.3 percent of their 27,000 person European workforce.

Since 2013, Danone has grown on the African continent, notably with the acquisition of a controlling interest in Centrale Danone in Morocco and equity interests in Fan Milk in West Africa and Brookside in Kenya.

In 2014, Emmanuel Faber became CEO.

Danone was present in 130 markets and generated sales of US$25.7 billion in 2016, with more than half in developing countries. In 2015, fresh dairy products represented 50% of the group's total sales, baby food 22%, branded water 21%, and medical nutrition 7%. In 2017, Franck Riboud became honorary chairman and Faber became chairman as well as retaining his CEO position.

In 2018, Danone rebranded its DanoneWave subsidiary, formed after the 2017 acquisition of WhiteWave Foods (Alpro), into Danone North America.

In 2020, Danone announced that It would cut up to 2,000 jobs as part of a reorganization. This amounted to about 2% of its workforce.

In late 2020, the entry of the London-based hedge fund Bluebell Capital as a shareholder of Danone put Emmanuel Faber’s position into question. In a letter sent to all shareholders in November 2020, they qualified Danone's stock market performance under the presidency of Emmanuel Faber of overall “disappointing”, arguing that “the right balance between shareholder value creation and sustainability issues” had not been struck under his tenure.
After the publication of only slightly comforting 2020 results and disappointing first trimester turnover figures, Bluebell Capital's activism paid off and Faber was ousted in mid-March 2021.
On May 16, 2021, the arrival of Antoine Bernard de Saint-Affrique as the next CEO of Danone is announced, to be effective on September 15.

Corporate governance

Head office
Danone's head office has been located in the 9th arrondissement of Paris since 2002.

Executives and board
Danone is led by a CEO and chairman as well as a board of directors. As of 26 April 2018 the 16 members of the Board of Directors are:
 Antoine de Saint-Affrique – CEO
 Franck Riboud – Honorary Chairman
Guido Barilla
Frédéric Boutebba
Cécile Cabanis
Gregg L. Engles
Clara Gaymard
Michel Landel
Gaëlle Olivier
Benoît Potier
Isabelle Seillier
Jean-Michel Severino
Virginia A. Stallings
Bettina Theissig
Serpil Timuray
Lionel Zinsou-Derlin

As of 2021 the members of the executive committee are as follows:

Main brands

Danone's brand portfolio includes both international brands and local brands. In 2018, Danone's international brands include: Activia, Actimel, Alpro, Aptamil, Danette, Danimals, Danio, Dannon, Danonino, Evian, Nutricia, Nutrilon, Volvic. Local or regional brands include: AQUA (Indonesia), Blédina (France), Bonafont (Mexico and Brazil), Cow & Gate (UK), Happy Family (USA), Horizon Organic (USA), Mizone (China and Indonesia), Oikos (North America, Chile), Prostokvashino (Russia), Silk (USA) and Damavand (Iran).

Ownership 
Ownership of Danone is split as follows: 43% is owned by American investors, 19% by French investors, followed by the UK (10%), Switzerland (6%), Germany (5%) and the rest of Europe (17%).

Joint ventures
In some areas, Danone has adopted a strategy of growth through joint ventures, particularly in fast-growing emerging markets which represent over 50% of its sales.

Danone signed joint ventures with Al Safi in Saudi Arabia (2001), Yakult in India (2005) and Vietnam (2006), Alquería in Colombia (2007), and Mengniu in China (2013–2014).

Bangladesh
In November 2005, Franck Riboud met Muhammad Yunus, founder of the Grameen Bank and later winner of the 2006 Nobel Peace Prize. The two men discussed at length their ideas on the development of poor countries and found that their areas of expertise were complementary. As a result, in 2006, the Grameen Bank and Danone formed a company called Grameen Danone Foods, a social business in Bangladesh.

Grameen Danone Foods Ltd. produces a yoghurt called Shokti Doi containing protein, vitamins, iron, calcium, zinc, and other micronutrients aimed to fill nutritional deficits of children in Bangladesh. Shokti Doi is sold for six euro cents, a price that studies found to be affordable for the poorest families. Its pursuit of profitability is based solely on criteria such as improving public health, creating jobs, reducing poverty and protecting the environment. Profits earned by the company are re-invested in expanding and running the business.

India
Dedicated to bringing health through food to as many people as possible, Danone started its nutrition business in India in 2012 through the acquisition of the nutrition portfolio from Wockhardt Group. Danone India offers a range of specialized products across life stages that includes pregnancy, infants, young children as well as adults, under recognized Indian and global brands like Aptamil, Neocate, Farex, Protinex, Dexolac and Nusobee. Headquartered in Mumbai, Danone strives to address the local nutritional needs of Indian consumers through innovation and science that supports healthier choices. In 2018, Danone reduced its product portfolio and discontinued some dairy SKUs to bring a sharper focus on its nutrition offerings.

Israel
In March 1996 Danone signed an agreement to purchase 20 percent of the Strauss Group, Israel's second largest food manufacturer. Since the 1970s, Strauss Dairies had a series of partnership and knowledge agreements with Danone.

China
Danone has invested in China since 1987 with the joint venture with Fengxing Milk in Guangzhou. It is one of Danone's top 5 markets.

Bright Dairy
In 2001, Danone acquired a 5% stake in Bright Dairy and, in March 2005, doubled its shareholding, and again, to 20%, in April 2006, becoming the third largest shareholder after Shanghai Milk Group and S.I. Food.

The parties announced in October 2007 that Danone would divest its stake by selling it to the other two main shareholders at a small profit. Bright Dairy said Danone would pay 330m yuan (€31m) to terminate the existing distribution and production agreement with it.<ref>Neil Merrett, Danone sells Chinese dairy stake , Dairy Reporter, 17 October 2007</ref>

Wahaha

The Hangzhou Wahaha Group, the largest beverage producer in China, and Danone entered into a dairy products joint venture in 1996, in which Danone held 51%. It was hailed by Forbes magazine as a "showcase" joint venture.

Yet in 2005, Danone noted that alongside the 39 structures of the joint venture, 60 factories and distribution companies produce and sell beverages illegally under the Wahaha brand. Danone made several attempts to take a stake in the Wahaha companies external to the joint venture, but was rebuffed by Wahaha's General Manager Zong Qinghou. Danone and Zong Qinghou had signed a deal in December 2006 allowing Danone to buy a majority stake in these non-JV operations. However, Zong had second thoughts about the deal and reneged, claiming the offer was underpriced and held out for a higher price from Danone.

The dispute took on the shape of a trademark dispute, and Danone filed for arbitration in Stockholm on 9 May 2007. On 4 June, Danone filed suit in Los Angeles Superior Court against Ever Maple Trading and Hangzhou Hongsheng Beverage Co Ltd, companies controlled by Zong, his wife, and daughter.

In 2009, an agreement was reached between the two parties. Danone left the Danone-Wahaha joint venture and sold its shares (51%) to its former Chinese partner.

Mengniu
On 20 May 2013, Danone announced a strategic investment (4.0%) in Mengniu, the top dairy products company in China, through an agreement with COFCO (the state-owned largest food company in China a majority shareholder in Mengniu). Later on, Danone raised its interest in Mengniu from 4.0% to 9.9%. In 2016, Danone is Mengniu's second shareholder.

In addition, in May 2013, a joint-venture was created between Danone and Mengniu to grow the fresh dairy product category.

On 31 October 2014, Danone, Mengniu and Yashili announced that they had signed an agreement allowing Danone to take part in a private placement by Yashili totalling €437 million, at a price of HK$3.70 per share. Upon completion of the subscription, Mengniu and Danone respectively held 51.0% and 25.0% equity interest in Yashili.

 Russia 
On 18 June 2010, Danone partnered with Unimilk, one of Russia's main milk producers. Danone and Unimilk merged their fresh dairy products activities in Russia, Ukraine, Kazakhstan and Belarus. The joint-venture gave birth to the number one dairy products company in this region. Russia became one of the five most important markets for Danone.

In October 2022, Danone announced the start of the process of transferring its Russian segment to new owners. By this point, Russia provided about 5% of the company's total revenue.

 Africa 
In June 2012, Danone raised its interest in Centrale Laitière (leader of the dairy products market in Morocco) to 67.0%. Centrale Laitière is Danone's first franchise ever: the companies have worked together since 1953.

In October 2013, Danone teamed up with Abraaj Group to acquire FanMilk International, the leading manufacturer and distributor of frozen dairy products and juices in Ghana, Togo, Nigeria, Burkina Faso, Benin and Ivory Coast.

In July 2014, Danone announced the acquisition of a 40% interest in Kenya's Brookside, East Africa's leading dairy products group.

 Philippines 
In Octobee 2014, Danone partnered with Universal Robina to build a beverage production and distribution business in the Philippines.

 Corporate social responsibility 
Danone operates several funds including: danone.communities, created in 2007 to finance social business, the Danone Ecosystem Fund, created in 2009 to provide support to Danone partners including farmers, subcontractors, and vendors, and Livelihoods, created in 2011 in order to finance environment-related projects (such as peasant agriculture, deforestation, access to energy in emerging countries) and in return provide investors with carbon credits with strong social intensity.

Danone's corporate social responsibility programs were influenced by former CEO, Antoine Riboud, and a speech he gave on 25 October 1972 known as the "Marseilles speech".

In this speech, he stated that growth should not take place without corporate social responsibility. He was the first CEO to publicly state that human and environment aspects of a company should be take into account. These ideas laid the ground to Danone's dual project (economic and social).

 Danone Institute 
The Danone Institute is a non-profit organization established to promote research, information and education about nutrition, diet and public health. One of the organization's main objectives was to increase nutrition knowledge amongst medical professionals, educators and parents.

The company set up its first Institute in 1991 in Paris, France, and officially launched as a private non-profit organization in 1997.

The institute is led by nutrition experts and Danone company executives.

 Danone Institutes around the world 

By 2007, Danone had set up 18 institutes in countries around the world to develop programs that address local public health issues. The institutes are located in Belgium, Canada, China, the Czech Republic, France, Germany, Indonesia, Israel, Italy, Japan, Mexico, Poland, Russia, Spain, the United States, and Turkey.

They operate under the aegis of the Danone Institute International. The Danone Institute International is responsible for steering the network, and encouraging a continual exchange between the various countries.

Today, more than 200 experts in diet and nutrition are involved in this international network.

Each institute is composed of a board of directors and a scientific council. Each board includes 8 members. The board members are responsible for setting the strategic direction and budget for the organization. The scientific council that is composed of from 6 to 10 members, takes future programmatic decisions.

The institutes develop educational programs in their countries to deal with local health and nutrition issues. Each institute therefore develops its own program in order to be relevant in their environment. For instance, the Czech Danone Institute provides a fund to support research, development and education in nutrition, and scholarships abroad.

Each local Danone Institute develops specific programs including:
 Support research programs: scholarships, grants, awards, prizes
 Publications of research findings relating to health and nutrition
 Organization of scientific conferences
 Publication of newsletters and books for professionals (e.g., health care professionals, educators, journalists)
 Organization of workshops, training and educational sessions for professionals 
 Production of pedagogic material, booklets, television and radio programs, PC games for parents, children...
 Spread the knowledge to the public

Throughout the world, the Danone Institutes continue to be non-profit organizations.

The Danone Institutes gather internationally renowned scientists in diet and nutrition from independent organizations (e.g.: universities, research centers).

From 1991 to 2006, more than 40 prizes and awards have been attributed for more than €600,000. Over 140 events have gathered more than 30,000 health care professionals. And 75 publications have been published. More than 70 programs towards the public have been organized.

To date, Danone Institutes have funded more than 900 research projects. This represents a global budget of €16 million. They have set up dozens of educational programs. 100 symposia have been launched.

 Danone Institute International 
The Danone Institute International was established in 2004 to gather together the 18 Danone Institutes. Its goal is to develop large-scale international programs. It also aims at encouraging the sharing of the knowledge between the local institutes. It facilitates cooperation, collaboration and exchange between scientists.

Danone Institute International is a non-profit organization originally established with funding from Danone. The association promotes the exchange of information related to the relationship between diet, nutrition and health.

The Danone Institute International comprises more than 220 scientific experts, and may be considered as a think tank. This international network gathers renowned scientists from various fields such as clinical nutrition, pediatric medicine, microbiology, gastroenterology, and psychology.

The Danone Institute International produces publications, supports research via grants, programs and a prize. The DII also organizes international academic conferences and symposia.

The Danone International Prize For Nutrition is a cornerstone in the work of the Danone Institute International.

 Danone International Prize for Nutrition 
The Danone International Prize for Nutrition is an award established in 1997 by the Danone Institute International, presented every two years to honour individuals or teams that have advanced the science of human nutrition.

The prize aims at encouraging nutrition research and promoting the public's understanding of the importance of this field.

This award is one of the most respected awards within the field of nutritional research. Many leading scientists received this award, that recognizes their accomplishments.

The Danone International Prize for Nutrition is worth €120,000. The prize is awarded every two years by the Danone Institute International and organized with the support of the French organization Fondation pour la Recherche Médicale.

The Danone International Prize for Nutrition recognizes a single researcher or a research team as leading a major step in nutrition, developing novel concepts, including research fields with potential application for populations.

The jury consists of up to nine members, including one member of the Fondation pour la Recherche Médicale. 50% of the jury members come from the Danone Institute International or the Danone Institutes. The jury selects one winner by a secret vote. In case of a tie, the chair's vote counts as two votes.

Danone Institute International selected in 2007 Friedman through a process involving more than 650 applicants worldwide. Candidates must be employed by a not-for-profit institution and actively involved in research. Laureates are chosen after an independent and international selection procedure.

This prize has been renamed the Danone International Prize for Alimentation in 2018.

Prize winners:
Source: Danone International
2016 Philip Calder, for his outstanding work on nutrition and immunity.
2013 Gökhan S. Hotamisligil, Harvard School of Public Health, for his outstanding research in immunology and metabolic diseases.
2011 Jeffery I. Gordon, Center for Genome Sciences and Systems Biology, Washington University School of Medicine, St. Louis, for his outstanding contribution to scientific research on the human gut microbiome, diet and nutritional status.
2009 Johan Auwerx, École Polytechnique Fédérale de Lausanne, for his research in molecular nutrition.
2007 Jeffrey M. Friedman, Rockefeller University and Howard Hughes Medical Institute; for research on the role of genetics and leptin, a hormone he discovered, in body-weight regulation.
2005 David J. P. Barker, epidemiologist at the Developmental Origins of Health and Disease Division Research Centre of Southampton University, UK and at the Heart Research Centre, Oregon Health and Science University, US, for the Barker Early Origins Hypothesis, also known as the fetal origins hypothesis or the thrifty phenotype hypothesis.
2003 Ricardo Bressani, for his life-time commitment to maximise the understanding of the nutritional potential and limitations of local basic foods 
2001 Alfred Sommer and team from the School of Hygiene and Public Health at Johns Hopkins University, for his work on Vitamin A deficiency1999 Leif Hallberg, for his work on iron metabolism1997 Vernon R. Young, for his work on protein and amino acids metabolism Global summit on the health effects of yogurt 
In 2012, the Danone Institute International in collaboration with the American Society for Nutrition (ASN) organized an international working group to examine the health effects of yogurt. They communicated their scientific conclusion to health care professionals and the public. One year later, the ASN and the Danone Institute International joined forces to launch the first global summit on the health effects of yogurt.

This event aims at evaluating the state of science as concerns yogurt consumption and public health.

The first summit took place in 2013 in Boston. It featured international experts in medicine and nutrition. Since that time, summits have been held every year.

 Yogurt in Nutrition Initiative for a balanced diet 
In 2013, the Danone Institute International, the American Society for Nutrition (ASN) and the Nutrition Society (NS) launched the Yogurt in Nutrition Initiative for a balanced diet. This program aims at examining the health effects of yogurt, encouraging research around yogurt as part of a healthy diet and communicating scientific information toward health care professionals and the public.

Through this project, the Danone Institute International plans to organize worldwide conferences to share researchers' findings. From 2013, the Yogurt in Nutrition Initiative for a balanced diet co-organizes every year Global Summit on the Health Effects of Yogurt.

The Danone Institute International in collaboration with the American Society for Nutrition and the International Osteoporosis Foundation also organizes the Yogurt in Nutrition Award. This prize is offered by the Yogurt in Nutrition Initiative for a balanced diet. This award, valued at US$30,000, supports projects focused on the role of yogurt in the prevention and management of diseases. It finances research programs for two years. It recognizes individuals or research teams from public organizations, universities or hospitals.

Controversies

2005–2006: the PepsiCo acquisition case
Due to its narrow focus and relatively small size, Danone is potentially an attractive takeover target for its competitors, namely Nestlé and Kraft Foods. In mid-July 2005, the share price of Danone rose 20% within two weeks on rumours of a bid approach by PepsiCo, although this intention was denied. Upon realising that a takeover of a national treasure such as Danone by a foreign company was indeed possible in the capital markets, the "economically patriotic" French government stepped in by drafting a law to protect companies in "strategic industries" such as Danone from takeover. This has been dubbed the "Danone Law".

Speculation was renewed once again in mid-2006, when PepsiCo declared its intention to grow significantly in France through a sizeable non-hostile acquisition, and Kraft was also reported in Le Figaro, a French daily newspaper, as not having ruled out an acquisition on French soil. The stock market apparently marked down the possibility of a bid by PepsiCo following Danone's acquisition of Numico.

 2010–2013 
In the 2010s, reports indicated that Danone engaged in unethical marketing of infant formula in China, Indonesia, Turkey, and India.

 India 
In the early 2010s, Nutricia India (Danone) purchased Wockhardt which thereby provided Danone with an entry to India's infant nutrition market. Nutricia later ordered and scheduled an external audit of payments made and invoices received from March through August 2013 and found no payments to doctors. However, critics contended the company directed the course of the audit, and more importantly, scheduled the audit so that it did not cover the crucial handover period. In fact, it was scheduled nearly a year after the purchase. A policy director for Baby Milk Action stated that Nutricia "seems to be using the audit as a cover."

India passed a law pertaining to Infant Milk Substitutes (IMS) in 1992 and strengthened this law in 2003. These prohibit any kind of advertisement of infant formula for children 0–2, as well as prohibit monetary benefits to doctors for recommending formula. Still, major companies including Danone have been criticized for sponsoring such things as nutritional conferences and web platforms for doctors. (Other companies include Nestle, Abbott, and Mead Johnson.)

Dexolac is the name of Danone's infant milk substitute product. Overall in India, approximately 50% of infants under six months of age are exclusively breastfed, and 50% are not.

China
In October 2012, a Save the Children survey was conducted in the cities of Hohhot, Beijing, Jinan, Shanghai, Nanjing, and Shenzhen. Sixty mothers of infants 0–6 months were interviewed in each city. 40% of the mothers interviewed said they had received formula samples. Of these, 60% were provided by company representatives, and over one-third by healthcare workers. The mothers reported that samples were provided by (in order of frequency): Dumex (Danone, and since May 2016 Yashili), Enfamil (Mead Johnson), Wyeth, Abbott, Nestlé, Friso, Ausnutria and Bei-yin-mei. The overall 2013 Save the Children report which includes this 2012 survey states, "If new mothers are given free samples to feed to their babies it can start a vicious circle that undermines their own ability to breastfeed. An infant satiated with formula may demand less breast milk, so the mother produces less, and that can result in her losing confidence in her ability to breastfeed."

 Indonesia subsidiary 
In February 2013 The Guardian reported that up until 2011, Danone subsidiary Sari Husada had midwives sign contracts to receive financial payments for selling a certain number of boxes of baby formula. According to Danone, this no longer happens, and has been replaced by a scheme which runs training for midwives. However, the main difference appears to be a change from cash to merchandise such as televisions or laptops, and often including items which are needed in the midwives' practices, such as oxygen canisters, TENS machines, and nebulisers. The Guardian has seen a spreadsheet detailing the number of new mothers contacted, the amount of 0–6 months formula sold, and the proportion of their target this represents. Danone commented: "That may still be happening, that's something we need to address."

This same article reported that Sari Husada (Danone) had links throughout the Indonesian medical system. For example, Sari Husada sponsored professional associations, paid doctors for running seminars for midwives, and even sponsored midwifery awards which were then presented by the Indonesian Minister for Women's Empowerment and the Protection of Children.

There are two potential harms to promoting infant formula in poorer communities: (1) the parents and families may not have dependable access to clean water, and (2) the ongoing cost is such a significant part of the family budget that parents are highly motivated to attempt to "stretch" the product, with risk of malnourishment to infant or child. An Indonesian paediatrician stated, "Selling formula is like the killing fields, in my opinion. The babies will die of diarrhoea and they will die of malnutrition."

 Turkey marketing campaign 
In June 2013 the organisation was accused in Turkey of "misleading mothers with a marketing campaign that warned they might not be providing enough breast milk to their babies [and suggesting] mothers use its powdered baby milk to make up any shortfall." Danone responded that it "based its advice on WHO guidance" and claimed that both the WHO and UNICEF "endorsed the campaign." The WHO said Danone did not have permission to use its logo and asked Danone to remove its name from the company's marketing materials within 14 days while Ayman Abulaban, the UNICEF representative for Turkey, said: "The Unicef Turkey office has not endorsed this campaign." UNICEF also requested that their name be removed from marketing materials.

Fonterra New Zealand alert
Following a statement by the New Zealand government and Fonterra on 2 August 2013 warning that batches of ingredients supplied by Fonterra to four Danone plants in Asia-Pacific might be contaminated with Clostridium botulinum bacteria, Danone recalled selected infant formula products from sale in eight markets (New Zealand, Singapore, Malaysia, China, Hong Kong, Vietnam, Cambodia and Thailand) as a precautionary measure.

The alert was lifted on 28 August when New Zealand Ministry for Primary Industries concluded after several weeks of tests that there was no Clostridium botulinum'' in any of the batches concerned. None of the many tests conducted by Danone before and after this period showed any contamination.

On 8 January 2014, Danone announced its decision to terminate its existing supply contract with Fonterra and make any further collaboration contingent on a commitment by its supplier to full transparency and compliance with the food safety procedures applied to all products supplied to Danone. Danone won damages of €105 million from Fonterra.

Gallery

References
Notes

Bibliography

External links

 

 
French brands
Food and drink companies established in 1919
Dairy products companies of France
Multinational companies headquartered in France
Multinational dairy companies
Multinational food companies
French chocolate companies
Drink brands
Medical food
CAC 40
Companies in the Euro Stoxx 50
Companies listed on Euronext Paris
French companies established in 1919
Yogurt companies